Claude Gravelle (born October 26, 1949) is a former Canadian politician, first elected to represent the electoral district of Nickel Belt in the 2008 Canadian federal election. He is a member of the New Democratic Party and was defeated in the 2015 Canadian federal election

Gravelle is a retired machinist and union organizer at Inco's mining operations in Sudbury, where he was a member of the United Steelworkers union. Gravelle first entered politics in 1997 on the town council of Rayside-Balfour. He did not run for re-election to Greater Sudbury City Council following the municipal amalgamation in the 2000 municipal election, but became co-chair of the Rayside-Balfour community action network. He ran for re-election to city council in the 2003 municipal election, but was not elected.

Gravelle ran as the federal New Democratic Party candidate in Nickel Belt in the 2004 and 2006 federal elections, losing narrowly to incumbent MP Ray Bonin both times. He won the riding in 2008 following Bonin's retirement, easily beating the new Liberal candidate, former city councillor Louise Portelance. In 2015, he lost to Liberal challenger Marc Serré.

Electoral record

References

External links
 Claude Gravelle
 

1949 births
Franco-Ontarian people
Members of the House of Commons of Canada from Ontario
New Democratic Party MPs
Politicians from Greater Sudbury
Ontario municipal councillors
Canadian trade unionists
Living people
21st-century Canadian politicians